Lapu-Lapu's at-large congressional district is the congressional district of the Philippines in Lapu-Lapu City. It has been represented in the House of Representatives of the Philippines since 2010. Previously included in Cebu's 6th congressional district, it includes all barangays of the city. It is currently represented in the 19th Congress by Cindi Chan of the PDP-Laban.

Representation history

Election results

2010

2013

2016

2019

2022

See also
Legislative district of Lapu-Lapu

References

Congressional districts of the Philippines
Politics of Lapu-Lapu, Philippines
2009 establishments in the Philippines
At-large congressional districts of the Philippines
Congressional districts of Central Visayas
Constituencies established in 2009